In general architecture a lucarne is a dormer window. This general meaning is also preserved in British use, particularly for small windows into unoccupied attic or spire spaces. Nikolaus Pevsner gives its meaning as "a small gabled opening in a roof or a spire".

In industrial architecture a lucarne or lucam is a feature of warehouses, mills, factories or the like in which a window, opening or housing high up on an exterior wall supports a hoist above doors on the floors below.

The simplest lucarne is no more than the extension of a roof beyond a gable wall, with a ridge timber strong enough to support a hoist. A gin wheel on this beam can provide a simple rope hoist, sufficient to lift a sack of grain.  Any greater weights than this are likely to need either a pulley block with multiple advantage, or a geared chain hoist.

Some lucarnes are enclosed, and are often wooden-clad structures cantilevered out from the wall. For strength though, the hoist is often carried by a steel girder or reinforced concrete structure. These enclosed lucarnes may act as a loading dock for that floor, with a trapdoor beneath, or they may be simply weather housings for a hoist serving the floors beneath. They are commonly a small housing high in the eaves, above the main working floors.

Mills may only require loading to a single floor, but warehouses will require access from each floor. Each hoist accesses all of the floors beneath it, through their prominent doors. These doors often provide a modern indication of an old warehouse building's original purpose. These doors sometimes have an iron fold-down flap outside them, as a short loading step, giving clearance for the hoist away from the wall.

Some large examples are multi-storey.

Where multiple vehicles could be alongside a building at once, there could be multiple closely spaced lucarnes in use simultaneously.

Repurposed buildings 

Many surviving warehouses are now converted as multiple flats. The large loading doorways on each floor are often converted with large windows and sometimes a balcony.  The lucarne is now superfluous and may be either preserved as a decorative feature, or (often for wooden examples in poor condition) removed. Some remain in a vestigial form, where they must still complete a roof, but the structure below has gone.

References 

Architectural elements
Warehouses